Kurala is a district in the Itäharju-Varissuo ward of the city of Turku, in Finland. It is located to the northeast of the city, and is largely a low-density residential suburb.

The current population of Kurala is 2,956, and it is decreasing at an annual rate of 1.25%. 13.26% of the district's population are under 15 years old, while 25.37% are over 65. The district's linguistic makeup is 93.78% Finnish, 4.30% Swedish, and 1.93% other.

See also
 Districts of Turku
 Districts of Turku by population

Districts of Turku